Leucoraja naevus is a species of fish belonging to the family Rajidae.

It is mainly found along the coasts of the Northern Atlantic Ocean and occasionally in the Mediterranean Sea.

References

naevus
IUCN Red List least concern species
Fish described in 1841